Driss Fettouhi (born 30 September 1989) is a Moroccan professional football plays for Al-Markhiya as a midfielder.

Club career
Born in Casablanca, Fettouhi started playing football at Wydad Casablanca. At 16, Fettouhi participated in a Moroccan reality TV show called "Golden Foot". The winner and nine finalists participated in a training session of Le Havre AC. He was the winner of the 2007 edition of the show. In the summer of 2009, Fettouhi joined FC Istres Ouest Provence,  in Ligue 2. In 2013, Fettouhi joined Emirati club Ajman.

International career
Fettouhi has been playing international football since 9 February 2011. He was the captain of the Morocco national under-23 football team in the 2012 Summer Olympics, which his team qualified for after beating Nigeria, Egypt and Algeria. He played in all 3 of the Atlas Lions' games there.

He made his debut for the Morocco national football team on 1 December 2021 in a 2021 FIFA Arab Cup game against Palestine.

Honours

Club
Al-Sailiya SC
Qatari Stars Cup: 2021-22

References

External links

1989 births
Living people
Footballers from Casablanca
Association football midfielders
Moroccan footballers
Morocco international footballers
Ligue 1 players
Ligue 2 players
Le Havre AC players
FC Istres players
Ajman Club players
Al Kharaitiyat SC players
Dibba FC players
Al-Hazem F.C. players
Al-Ahli Saudi FC players
Al-Sailiya SC players
Al-Markhiya SC players
UAE First Division League players
UAE Pro League players
Qatar Stars League players
Saudi Professional League players
Moroccan expatriate footballers
Expatriate footballers in France
Expatriate footballers in the United Arab Emirates
Expatriate footballers in Qatar
Expatriate footballers in Saudi Arabia
Moroccan expatriate sportspeople in France
Moroccan expatriate sportspeople in the United Arab Emirates
Moroccan expatriate sportspeople in Qatar
Moroccan expatriate sportspeople in Saudi Arabia
2011 CAF U-23 Championship players
Olympic footballers of Morocco
Footballers at the 2012 Summer Olympics